The Geno Biosphere Reserve, with a total area of 27,500 hectares, situated in the Hormozgan province of Iran. It has been designated as a protected area by the Iranian Department of Environment in 1976.

Geno has mountains as high as 3,000 meters above sea level, and in light of this, has a unique climatic and biosphere conditions within the Persian gulf region.

UNESCO reported about 40,300 people living within the boundaries of the biosphere reserve in 2000.

Beside a number of hot springs situated in the area, flora and fauna include:
 Flora: pomegranate, date palm, black maidenhair fern, caraway, common yarrow, pennyroyal, milkweed, primrose
 Fauna:
 mammals: gazelle, gray wolf, bear, fox, leopard, wild boar, hyena, jackal, rabbit,
 birds: grey partridge, eagle, falcon, Eurasian collared dove, see-see partridge, common wood pigeon, cinereous vulture, lark, pipit, common house martin, white-eared bulbul

Gallery

See also
 International Network of Geoparks
 List of Geoparks

References

External links
 Map on Wikimapia
 Medicinal plants of the Geno protected area
 Hormozgan Dept. of Environment info page

Biosphere reserves of Iran
Global Geoparks Network members
Geoparks in Iran
Geography of Hormozgan Province